The Bundesstraße 85 (abbr. B 85) runs southeast through Thuringia and Bavaria, from Kyffhäuser to Passau, near the Austrian border.

Cities and towns along B85:
Berga (Kyffhäuser) – Bad Frankenhausen – Kölleda – Weimar – Rudolstadt – Saalfeld/Saale – Kronach – Kulmbach – Bayreuth – Pegnitz – Auerbach in der Oberpfalz – Sulzbach-Rosenberg – Amberg – Schwandorf – Roding – Cham – Viechtach – Regen – Schönberg (Lower Bavaria) – Passau

B85 is the successor to Reichsstraße R 85, which followed a similar route: Berga (Kyffhäuser) – Bayreuth – Vilseck – Amberg – Passau.

See also
List of federal highways in Germany

External links 
 The B85 as the "Bier- und Burgenstraße" ("Beer and Castle Road") for marketing purposes (German only)

085
Roads in Bavaria
Roads in Thuringia